Elisabeth of Württemberg (Elisabeth Wilhelmine Luise; 21 April 1767 – 18 February 1790) was a duchess of Württemberg by birth and an archduchess of Austria by her marriage to Archduke Francis of Austria.

Life
Elisabeth Wilhelmine Luise was born on 21 April 1767, in Treptow an der Rega, Province of Pomerania (present-day Trzebiatów, Poland) as the third daughter and eighth child of Frederick II Eugene, Duke of Württemberg and his wife, born Princess Friederike of Brandenburg-Schwedt.

At the age of fifteen, she was summoned by the Holy Roman emperor, Joseph II, to Vienna. There, she was educated in a convent of the Salesian sisters converted to Roman Catholicism in anticipation for her marriage to Joseph's nephew, son of his heir presumptive, Leopold, Francis. They were married in Vienna on 6 January 1788. At this time, Emperor Joseph was in ill health; the young archduchess became close to the emperor and brightened his last years with her youthful charm.

At the end of 1789, Elisabeth became pregnant; however, her condition was very delicate. On 15 February 1790, after attending the anointing of the sick for the dying emperor, Elisabeth fainted. On the night of 18 February, after a twenty-four-hour delivery, she prematurely gave birth to Archduchess Ludovika Elisabeth, who lived for sixteen months. Despite an emergency operation to save her life, Elisabeth did not survive and was buried in the Imperial Crypt.The emperor died two days later.

Issue
Archduchess Ludovika Elisabeth of Austria (18 Feb 1790 – 24 June 1791), died in infancy.

Archives
Elisabeth's letters to her parents, Frederick II Eugene, Duke of Württemberg and Princess Friederike of Brandenburg-Schwedt, written between 1780 and 1790, are preserved in the State Archive of Stuttgart (Hauptstaatsarchiv Stuttgart) in Stuttgart, Germany. Elisabeth's letters to her brother, Charles Frederick Henry of Württemberg, are also preserved in the State Archive of Stuttgart.

Ancestry

References

Brigitte Hamann: Die Habsburger, ein biographisches Lexikon. Verlag Carl Ueberreuter, Vienna, 1988

1767 births
1790 deaths
Deaths in childbirth
House of Habsburg-Lorraine
Austrian princesses
German Roman Catholics
Converts to Roman Catholicism from Lutheranism
Duchesses of Württemberg
Burials at the Imperial Crypt
People from Trzebiatów
People from the Province of Pomerania
18th-century Austrian women
Wives of Francis II, Holy Roman Emperor
Daughters of monarchs